Kim Eun-young (born May 25, 1990), known by her stage name Cheetah, is a South Korean rapper. Cheetah rose to fame as the winner on the TV competition Unpretty Rapstar. She debuted in 2010 with the song "Stop (Money Can't Buy Me Love)" as a part of the duo Blacklist and was signed under C9 Entertainment. In April 2020, she left C9 Entertainment, which she belonged to from her debut, and founded the one-person agency, Ceuda Entertainment.

Career
Before debuting in the music industry, Cheetah originally performed as an underground rapper on the streets after dropping out of high school. However, in July 2010 she officially debuted with the song "Stop (Money Can't Buy Me Love)" as a part of the hip-hop duo, Blacklist. With fellow member Lucy, the duo released two songs, "Nothing Lasts Forever" and "Stop". However, the group disbanded shortly afterwards.

After Blacklist, Cheetah made several solo appearances including featuring on other rappers' tracks and also appearing on the rap contest TV show Show Me The Money. In 2012, she joined hip-hop artist Crush in another duo group, called Masterpiece. The duo released the single, "Rollercoaster" in May 2012. Again, the group performed poorly with the public and resulted in disbandment.

In 2014, Cheetah released her first EP, called Cheetah Itself. The mini-album showcased her powerful rap and drew attention to her talent as a solo artist. The album aided in placing her on the contestant roster for the rap survival spin-off of Show Me The Money, Unpretty Rapstar.

In early 2015, Cheetah was revealed to be one of the contestants on the TV show Unpretty Rapstar. The competition notably included Lucky J member Jessi, AOA's Jimin, and other underground female rappers. In the show's finale, Cheetah was announced as the winner.

Since her rise in popularity from her appearance and win on Unpretty Rapstar, Cheetah has also appeared in multiple endorsements and fashion spreads. The rapper also participated in designing and releasing a fashion line in collaboration with Push Button.

In March 2015, Cheetah was reported as preparing for a new album, to be released later in the year.

Cheetah released her first single since appearing on Unpretty Rapstar. The song My Number was released on August 2, 2015.

In October 2015 Cheetah collaborated with Kim Junsu on his EP and featured in the track Midnight Show. In the same month, despite being known as a rapper, Cheetah appeared in the MBC singing variety show King of Mask Singer as a jazz singer.

In January 2016, she appeared as a mentor in Produce 101 and continued to reprise her role in the second season, in Produce 48 and in Produce X 101.

In 2018, she released her first Korean-language studio album 28 Identity.

Personal life
In January 2007, Cheetah was crossing a street when she was hit by a bus, leading to her hospitalization. Cheetah was sent into a coma for an extended period of time with little chance of waking up. However, she recovered without any major complications, although she lost the ability to sing due to the continued use of a respirator. Cheetah has stated that this traumatic experience is what drove her to succeed and "live with no regrets".

Discography

Studio albums

Extended plays

Singles

Appearances in Albums

Filmography

Film

Television series

Variety show

Notes

References

External links
  at C9 Entertainment 

1990 births
Living people
South Korean women rappers
Unpretty Rapstar contestants
21st-century South Korean women singers
21st-century South Korean singers